Acer confertifolium is an Asian species of maple. It has been found only in China (Fujian, Guangdong, Jiangxi).

Acer confertifolium is a shrub or small tree up to 4 meters tall. Leaves are non-compound, the blade narrowly egg-shaped, up to 5 cm long and 4 cm wide, each with 3 lobes and a few sharp teeth.

References

confertifolium
Plants described in 1937
Flora of China